Shaadi is a 1962 Indian Hindi-language film directed by Krishnan–Panju. The film stars Dharmendra, Manoj Kumar and Saira Banu. It is a remake of the Tamil film Orey Vazhi (1959).

Plot
An elder patriarch, Ratan Malhotra, and his wife have a happy household that consists of his younger brother Ramesh (Dharmendra) and Gauri (Saira Banu). Ramesh marries Kala (Indrani), daughter of a rich, well placed judge. Gauri's marriage is fixed with Raja (Manoj Kumar), the son of a greedy businessman, Daulatram (Om Prakash). However, due to a plane accident in which lost his memory, Ramesh is unable to reach the wedding in time, with the dowry money making Daulatram walk off immediately after the end of the marriage rituals, with his son in law.

Raja and Gauri meet in Bombay, where Gauri realizes that Raja is her husband and wants to make it big on his own. Ratan and Shanti end up in Bombay in search of Gauri and face an embittered Kala, who blames them for Ramesh's amnesiac state, insults them and throws them out of the house.

Ramesh recovers his memory and returns to his village, only to realize that in his absence, his sister's wedding was called off due to lack of money and his older brother had to sell of their ancestral property to repay the loan. Holding Kala responsible, he separates and begins to search for his brother.

Raja makes it big as an actor, and his father learns a lesson about importance of relationships over money. Raja, Gauri, Ramesh, Kala, Ratan and Shanti have a reunion. Everyone lives happily ever after.

Cast
 Balraj Sahni...Ratan
 Dharmendra...Ramesh
 Manoj Kumar...Raja
 Saira Banu...Gauri
 Indrani Mukherjee...Kala
Om Prakash...Seth Daulat Ram
 Sulochana Latkar...Shanti
 Raj Mehra...Judge Motilal
 Manorama...Mrs. Motilal
 Randhir...Manager
 Leela Mishra...Forty Two's Aunt
 Ravikant		
 Som Haksar
 Keshav Rana...Loafer
 Kalpana		
 Kesri		
 Mohan Choti...Forty Two

Music
"Aaj Ki Raat Naya Chaand Leke Aayi Hai" - Lata Mangeshkar
"Ja Aur Kahi Ro Shehnai Ja Ab Mai Hu Aur Meri Tanhai" - Lata Mangeshkar
"Mukhadaa Teraa Saaf Nahin, Jaisaa Kiyaa Hai Tune" - Mohammed Rafi
"Chhod De Bedardi Chhod De" - Lata Mangeshkar
"Log Toh Baat Ka Afsana Bana Dete Hai" - Mohammed Rafi, Manna Dey
"Na Jane Kaha Mera Bachpan" - Lata Mangeshkar
"Teri Sharan Pada Hua Data Tu Hi Pita Hai Tu Hi Mata" - Mohammed Rafi

References

External links

1962 films
1960s Hindi-language films
Films about Indian weddings
Films directed by Krishnan–Panju
Films scored by Chitragupta
Films scored by Khemchand Prakash
Hindi remakes of Tamil films